Buena Vista Independent School District is a public school district based in the community of Imperial, Texas (USA).

The district has one school, Buena Vista School that serves students in grades pre-kindergarten through twelve.

In 2009, the school district was rated "academically acceptable" by the Texas Education Agency.

Special programs

Athletics
Buena Vista High School plays six-man football.

See also

List of school districts in Texas

References

External links

School districts in Pecos County, Texas